William Taylor "Spike" Dykes (March 14, 1938 – April 10, 2017) was an American football coach. A high school and college football coach throughout his career, he last served as head coach at Texas Tech University from 1986 to 1999.

Coaching career

Early years
Born in Lubbock, Texas and raised in Ballinger, Dykes graduated from Ballinger High School in 1955 and Stephen F. Austin State University in 1959. At Stephen F. Austin, Dykes played center on the Lumberjacks football team. Upon graduation, he served in several high school head and assistant coaching positions, including a stint as defensive coordinator under Emory Bellard at San Angelo Central High School in San Angelo, Texas. In 1972, Dykes became an assistant coach at the University of Texas. He filled assistant roles at two other universities before returning to the high school level to coach at Midland Lee from 1980 to 1983.

Texas Tech
Dykes moved to Texas Tech in 1984, serving as defensive coordinator under Jerry Moore and David McWilliams. When McWilliams left for Texas after the 1986 season, Dykes was named his successor. He was the first coach in school history to lead the team to seven straight bowl-eligible seasons and to coach the team in seven bowl games.

Dykes was the school's first coach to defeat the Texas Longhorns in six different seasons. He earned three Southwest Conference and one Big 12 Conference Coach of the Year honors. His record at Tech stands at 82–67–1. On November 20, 1999, Dykes retired after 13 seasons as head coach.  His 82 wins were the most in school history until his successor, Mike Leach, passed him in 2009.

Late life and death
Dykes moved to Horseshoe Bay, Texas after retiring from coaching and also bought a house on Matagorda Bay.

On March 11, 2008, Dykes was inducted in the Texas Sports Hall of Fame.

Dykes died on April 10, 2017, in Horseshoe Bay, Texas, at age 79.

Family
One of Dykes' two sons, Sonny, is also a college football coach, currently the head football coach at Texas Christian University (TCU). The younger Dykes previously served as the head football coach at Louisiana Tech University from 2010 to 2012, the University of California, Berkeley from 2013 to 2016, and Southern Methodist University (SMU) from 2017 to 2021. Dykes' other son, Rick, spent many years as an assistant football coach at Texas Tech, including a stint as offensive coordinator. Rick was later a partner of the now disgraced Reagor Dykes Auto Group. Dykes also had a daughter, Bebe.

Head coaching record

College

*Dykes coached bowl game after McWilliams left for Texas.

Bibliography

References

External links
 Texas Tech profile

1938 births
2017 deaths
American football centers
Mississippi State Bulldogs football coaches
New Mexico Lobos football coaches
Stephen F. Austin Lumberjacks football players
Texas Longhorns football coaches
Texas Tech Red Raiders football coaches
High school football coaches in Texas
Sportspeople from Lubbock, Texas
People from Ballinger, Texas
People from Horseshoe Bay, Texas
Coaches of American football from Texas
Players of American football from Texas